Aino Autio (4 January 1932 – 17 November 2022) was a Finnish sprinter. She competed in the women's 4 × 100 metres relay at the 1952 Summer Olympics.

References

External links
 

1932 births
2022 deaths
Athletes (track and field) at the 1952 Summer Olympics
Finnish female sprinters
Finnish female hurdlers
Olympic athletes of Finland
Place of birth missing